Dichomeris atomogypsa is a moth of the family Gelechiidae. It was described by Edward Meyrick in 1932. It is known from Korea and the Japanese islands of Honshu and Shikoku.

The larvae feed on Quercus acutissima, Q. dentata, and Q. serrata.

References

atomogypsa
Moths described in 1932
Moths of Japan
Taxa named by Edward Meyrick